This is a list of yearly Atlantic Central Football Conference standings.

Atlantic Central Football Conference standings

References

 

Atlantic Central Football Conference
Standings